Robert Alexis (Lex) Green (February 10, 1892 – February 9, 1973) was an American educator, lawyer, jurist, and politician who served as a U.S. Representative from Florida from 1925 to 1944.

Early life and career
Green was born near Lake Butler, Bradford County (now Union County), Florida, where he attended the rural schools. He commenced teaching in the Liberty Public School at the age of 16.
He was graduated from the high school at Lake Butler in 1913.

He served as a messenger in the State house of representatives from 1913 to 1915, then was an assistant chief clerk of the State house of representatives from 1915 to 1917 and chief clerk in 1917 and 1918.

He attended the University of Florida at Gainesville in 1916, then studied accounting and business administration at Howard College [now Samford University].

He returned to Florida to become a principal at Suwannee High School in 1916 and 1917.

He served as vice president of the Florida Educational Association in 1918, then as a member of the State house of representatives from 1918 to 1920, serving as speaker pro tempore in 1918.

He studied law at Yale University and was admitted to the bar in 1921 and commenced practice in Starke, Fla.

Green was elected judge of Bradford County, Florida in 1921 and served until 1924, when he resigned, having been elected to Congress.

Congress
Green was elected as a Democrat to the Sixty-ninth Congress.
He was reelected to the nine succeeding Congresses and served from March 4, 1925, until his resignation on November 25, 1944, to enter the United States Navy.

He served as chairman of the Committee on Territories (Seventy-third through Seventy-eighth Congresses).
He was not a candidate for renomination in 1944 to the Seventy-ninth Congress, but was an unsuccessful candidate for the Florida gubernatorial nomination.

Military service and later career
Green served as a lieutenant commander in the United States Navy from November 25, 1944, to November 2, 1945, and resumed the practice of law at Starke, Florida, and served as county prosecuting attorney and as city attorney for the city of Starke. He was member of the Democratic Executive committee, Bradford County, and State Democratic Executive committee.

Death
Green died February 9, 1973, in Gainesville, Florida and was interred in New River Cemetery in Bradford County near the community of New River, Florida.

References

University of Florida alumni
1892 births
Democratic Party members of the United States House of Representatives from Florida
1973 deaths
Yale Law School alumni
Howard University alumni
20th-century American politicians
People from Starke, Florida